Ranjan Sen (born 1967) is an Indian microbiologist, biophysicist and a senior scientist as well as the head of the Laboratory of Transcription at the Centre for DNA Fingerprinting and Diagnostics. Known for his studies in the field of prokaryotic transcription, Sen is an elected fellow of the Indian National Science Academy and the National Academy of Sciences, India. The Department of Biotechnology of the Government of India awarded him the National Bioscience Award for Career Development, one of the highest Indian science awards, for his contributions to biosciences in 2007.

Biography 

Ranjan Sen, born in 1967 in the Indian state of West Bengal, earned the post-graduate degree of MSc in molecular biology and biophysics in 1991 from the University of Calcutta and did his doctoral studies on the conformational changes of E.coli RNA polymerase during transcription initiation under the guidance of Dipak Dasgupta at the Saha Institute of Nuclear Physics to secure a PhD in 1996. His post-doctoral work was, first at the laboratory of Nobuo Shimamoto of the National Institute of Genetics during 1995–98 and later, with Robert Weisberg at the National Institutes of Health during 1998–2001. On his return to India in 2002, he joined the Centre for DNA Fingerprinting and Diagnostics (CDFD) as a scientist. He continues at the institution, holding the position of a scientist grade IV and heads the Lab of Transcription where he hosts several scientists and scholars. He also serves as the director-in-charge of CDFD.

During his post-doctoral days in Japan, Sen worked on the kinetics of abortive transcription in prokaryotes and proposed the concept of branched pathway during transcription initiation process. While in the US, he furthered his work by focusing on transcription antitermination mechanisms by PUT RNA. At CDFD, the team led by him is involved in the studies of antitermination in prokaryotes, combining physical, chemical, biological and genetic techniques. His studies have been documented by way of a number of articles and ResearchGate, an online repository of scientific articles has listed 60 of them. He is also a member of the Task Force on Biotechnology set up by the Science and Engineering Research Board of the Department of Science and Technology.

Awards and honors  
The Department of Biotechnology of the Government of India awarded him the National Bioscience Award for Career Development, one of the highest Indian science awards in 2007 the same year as he was elected as a member of the Guha Research Conference. The National Academy of Sciences, India elected him as a fellow in 2011 and he received the elected fellowship of the Indian National Science Academy in 2017. He is also a recipient of several research fellowships which included GRIP Grant of the National Institutes of Health (2002), Senior Research Fellowship of Wellcome Trust (2003) and the Swarnajayanti Fellowship of the Department of Science and Technology (2006).

Selected bibliography

See also 

 Rho factor
 Escherichia coli

Notes

References

Further reading 
 

N-BIOS Prize recipients
Indian scientific authors
Living people
20th-century Indian biologists
Indian biophysicists
Scientists from West Bengal
1966 births
University of Calcutta alumni
National Institutes of Health people
Fellows of the Indian National Science Academy
Fellows of The National Academy of Sciences, India